Shri Raghunath Ji Temple is a Hindu temple. It is the ancient temple of Hindaun City. The temple is approximately 650 year old. The temple is located at Tulsipura near Nakkash Ki Devi - Gomti Dham

It is situated in the Hindaun City, in the Indian state of Rajasthan. Raghunath ji is a name of Hindu lord of Rama.

Nearest cities is Hindaun (0 km), Karauli (30 km), Gangapur City (43 km). The temple is located near of the Jalsen Reservoir.

References

Hindu temples in Rajasthan
Tourist attractions in Karauli district
Tourist attractions in Hindaun
Hindaun